Greya is a genus of moths of the family Prodoxidae.

Species
The genus consists of the following species:

 Greya enchrysa
 Greya kononenkoi
 Greya marginimaculata
 Greya mitellae
 Greya obscura
 Greya obscuromaculata
 Greya pectinifera
 Greya piperella
 Greya politella
 Greya powelli
 Greya punctiferella
 Greya reticulata
 Greya solenobiella
 Greya sparsipunctella
 Greya subalba
 Greya suffusca
 Greya variabilis
 Greya variata

References

 Greya at tolweb

Prodoxidae
Adeloidea genera